Luzhou Lantian Airport  was a dual-use military and public airport in the city of Luzhou in Sichuan, China. It was built in 1945 and initially served an air route between China and India by the US Air Force during World War II. Services were suspended in the 1960s, but later it was used for training purposes by the People's Liberation Army Air Force. Major renovations and expansions were completed in January 2001.

Due to the limitation of the airport, the new Luzhou Yunlong Airport was constructed in the town of Yunlong in Lu County. It was opened on 10 September 2018, and all flights were transferred to the new airport.

See also
List of airports in China
List of the busiest airports in China

References

Airports in Sichuan
Airports established in 1945
Defunct airports in China
1945 establishments in China
Luzhou
2018 disestablishments in China